The 1952 All-Ireland Senior Hurling Championship was the 66th staging of the All-Ireland hurling championship since its establishment by the Gaelic Athletic Association in 1887. The championship began on 27 April 1952 and ended on 7 September 1952.

Tipperary were the defending champions and were on course for a record-equalling fourth successive All-Ireland, however, they were defeated in the provincial championship. Cork won the title following a 2-14 to 0-7 defeat of Dublin in the final.

Teams

Team summaries

Results

Leinster Senior Hurling Championship

First round

Semi-finals

Final

Munster Senior Hurling Championship

First round

Semi-finals

Final

All-Ireland Senior Hurling Championship

Semi-final

Final

Championship statistics

Top scorers

Top scorers overall

Top scorers in a single game

Scoring

Widest winning margin: 17 points 
Tipperary 8-10 - 3-8 Waterford (Munster semi-final, 29 June 1952)
Most goals in a match: 11 
Tipperary 8-10 - 3-8 Waterford (Munster semi-final, 29 June 1952)
Most points in a match: 21 
Cork 2-14 - 0-7 Dublin (All-Ireland final, 7 September 1952)
Most goals by one team in a match: 8 
Tipperary 8-10 - 3-8 Waterford (Munster semi-final, 29 June 1952)
Most goals scored by a losing team: 5 
Kilkenny 5-1 - 4-7 Wexford (Leinster semi-final, 8 June 1952)
Most points scored by a losing team: 10 
Offaly 2-8 - 3-8 Kilkenny (Leinster quarter-final, 4 May 1952)
Waterford 3-8 - 8-10 Tipperary (Munster semi-final, 29 June 1952)

Miscellaneous

 Tipperary's 8-10 to 3-8 Munster semi-final defeat of Waterford was their 16th consecutive championship game without defeat. This 16-game unbeaten streak, which included 15 wins and one draw, was a record which stood until 9 August 2009 when Kilkenny recorded their 17th successive championship victory.

Sources

 Corry, Eoghan, The GAA Book of Lists (Hodder Headline Ireland, 2005).
 Donegan, Des, The Complete Handbook of Gaelic Games (DBA Publications Limited, 2005).
 Horgan, Tim, Christy Ring: Hurling's Greatest (The Collins Press, 2007).
 Nolan, Pat, Flashbacks: A Half Century of Cork Hurling (The Collins Press, 2000).
 Sweeney, Éamonn, Munster Hurling Legends (The O'Brien Press, 2002).

External links
 1952 All-Ireland Senior Hurling Championship results

References

1956